This is a chronological list of houses, commercial buildings and other works by Marcel Breuer.

At Bauhaus – Weimar and Dessau 
1921       The African chair with Gunta Stölzl (while still a student)
1923       Furniture and built-in cabinetry for the Haus am Horn, Weimar (while still a student)
1925	First all-tubular steel chair (the Wassily)
1925	Stool / Side Table of tubular steel (leading to cantilevered chair)
1926	Gropius, Moholy-Nagy, Kandinsky, and Muche Interiors– the Bauhaus – Dessau, Germany
1927	Piscator Apartment – Berlin, Germany	
1927	Weissenhof Siedlung – Gropius and Stam Apartment Interiors – Stuttgart, Germany
1928	First cantilevered steel chair (the Cesca)
1929	Model B 55 cantilevered steel chair

Independent practice – Berlin and Zurich 

1931	Berlin Building Exhibition – "Haus fur ein Sportsmann" – Berlin, Germany
1932	Harnischmacher House I – Wiesbaden, Germany
— 1954 Harnischmacher House II – Wiesbaden, Germany
1932	Wohnbedarf Furniture Stores – Basel and Zurich, Switzerland – for Sigfried Giedion
1935	Doldertal Apartments – Zurich, Switzerland – with A and E Roth for Sigfried Giedion

With Isokon and in partnership with FRS Yorke – London 

1935	Isokon furniture company – Plywood Tables and Stacking Chairs– London, England
— 1936 Isokon Furniture Company – Reclining Plywood Chairs– London, England
1936	Ventris Apartment in Highpoint – London, England
1936	Model for the "Civic Center of the Future" – with FRS Yorke
1936	Gane's Exhibition Pavilion – Bristol, England – with FRS Yorke
1936	Sea Lane House, East Preston, West Sussex
1938	Houses in Hampshire, Sussex, and Eton College, England – with FRS Yorke

At Harvard University, Cambridge, Massachusetts with Gropius 

1938        Gropius House – Lincoln, Massachusetts – with Walter Gropius
1938	Hagerty House – Cohasset, Massachusetts – with Walter Gropius
1939	Breuer House – Lincoln, Massachusetts – with Walter Gropius

1939	Ford House – Lincoln, Massachusetts – with Walter Gropius
1939	Frank House – Pittsburgh, Pennsylvania – with Walter Gropius
1939	New York World's Fair – Pennsylvania State Exhibition –– with Walter Gropius
1940	Chamberlain Cottage – Wayland, Massachusetts – with Walter Gropius
1941	Weizenblatt House – Asheville, North Carolina – with Walter Gropius
1941	Defense Housing for Aluminum Workers – New Kensington, Pennsylvania – with Walter Gropius

Independent practice while still at Harvard 

1945	Project for Serviceman's Memorial – Cambridge, Massachusetts – with Lawrence S Anderson
1945	Geller House I – Lawrence, New York
— 1969	Geller House II – Lawrence, New York – with Herbert Beckhard
1946	Tompkins House – Hewlett Harbor, New York

Independent practice in New York City with associates 

1947	Breuer House – New Canaan I, Connecticut (cantilevered)
— 1951       Breuer House – New Canaan II, Connecticut (rubble stone)
1947	Mills House – New Canaan, Connecticut
1947	Ariston Club – Mar del Plata, Argentina – with Eduardo Catalano
1947	Robinson House – Williamstown, Massachusetts
1948	Kniffen House – New Canaan, Connecticut – with Eliot Noyes
1948	Scott House – Dennis, Massachusetts
1948	Thompson House – Ligonier, Pennsylvania
1949	Kepes and Breuer Cottages – Wellfleet, Massachusetts
— 1953	Edgar Stillman Cottage – Wellfleet, Massachusetts
— 1963	Wise Cottage – Wellfleet, Massachusetts
1949	Hooper House I – Baltimore, Maryland
— 1959	Hooper House II – Baltimore, Maryland – with Herbert Beckhard
1949	House in the Museum Garden at Museum of Modern Art (MoMA), New York
— 1950	Tilley House – Red Bank, New Jersey – based upon the MoMA House
— 1950	Lauck House – Princeton, New Jersey – based upon the MoMA House
— 1950	Foote House – Chappaqua, New York – based upon the MoMA House
1950	Marshad House – Croton-on-Hudson, New York
1950	Wolfson Trailer House – Pleasant Valley, New York
1950	Clark House – Orange, Ct
1950	Englund House – Pleasantville, New York
1950	Hanson House – Huntington, New York
1950	Rufus Stillman House I – Litchfield, Connecticut
— 1965	Rufus Stillman House II – Litchfield, Connecticut – with Herbert Beckhard
— 1974	Rufus Stillman House III – Litchfield, Connecticut – with Tician Papachristou
1950	Peter and Karen McComb House – Poughkeepsie, New York
1950	Ferry Cooperative Dormitory at Vassar College – Poughkeepsie, New York
1951	Pack House – Scarsdale, New York
1951 	Witalis House – Kings Point, New York
1951	Sarah Lawrence College – Arts Center  – Bronxville, New York
1951	Grosse Pointe Public Library in Grosse Pointe, Michigan
1951	Abraham & Straus – Exterior Façade – Hemptead, New York
1952	Caesar Cottage – Lakeville, Connecticut
1952	Levy House – Princeton, New Jersey
1953	Torin Corp – Manufacturing Plant –Oakville, Ontario – Canada
’’1954’’       Crall House - Gates Mills, Ohio
— 1956	Torin Corp – Manufacturing Plant– Van Nuys, California – with Craig Ellwood
— 1963	Torin Corp – Machine Division– Torrington, Connecticut – with Robert Gatje
— 1964	Torin Corp – Manufacturing Plant in Nivelles, Belgium,  with Hamilton Smith
— 1966	Torin Corp – Administration Building– Torrington, Connecticut – with Herbert Beckhard
— 1966	Torin Corp – Manufacturing Plant – Swindon, England – with Robert Gatje
— 1968	Torin Corp – Manufacturing Plant – Rochester, Indiana – with Robert Gatje
— 1971       Torin Corp – Technical Center – Torrington, Connecticut – with Herbert Beckhard
— 1976	Torin Corp – Manufacturing Plant– Penrith Australia –with Herbert Beckhard
1953	Saint John's Abbey and University – Master Plan – Collegeville, Minnesota – with Hamilton Smith
— 1955	Saint John's Abbey – Monastery Wing – Collegeville, Minnesota – with Hamilton Smith
— 1959	Saint John's University – St. Thomas Aquinas Hall –  Collegeville, Minnesota – with Hamilton Smith
— 1961	Saint John's Abbey – Church and Bell Banner – Collegeville, Minnesota – with Hamilton Smith
— 1966	Alcuin Library at Saint John's University in Collegeville, Minnesota, with Hamilton Smith
— 1966	Saint John's University – Peter Engel Science Building – Collegeville, Minnesota – with Hamilton Smith
— 1967	Saint John's University – St. Patrick, St. Boniface, St. Bernard Halls – Collegeville, Minnesota – with Hamilton Smith
— 1968	Saint John's University – Ecumenical Institute – Collegeville, Minnesota – with Robert Gatje
1953	Northfield Elementary School – Litchfield, Connecticut – with O’Connor & Kilham
— 1956	Bantam Elementary School – Bantam, Connecticut – with O’Connor & Kilham
— 1956	Litchfield High School (Litchfield, Connecticut) – with O’Connor & Kilham
1954	Neumann House – Croton-on-Hudson
1954	Snower House – Kansas City, Kansas – with Robert Gatje
1954	Grieco House – Andover, Massachusetts
1954	O E McIntyre, Inc – Manufacturing Plant – Westbury, New York – with William Landsberg
1954	Starkey House – Duluth, Minnesota – with Herbert Beckhard and Robert Gatje
1954	Gagarin House – Litchfield, Connecticut – with Herbert Beckhard
1955	Connecticut Junior Republic – Litchfield, Connecticut – with Herbert Beckhard
1956 	Karsten House – Owings Mill, Maryland
1957	Laaff House – Andover, Massachusetts – with Herbert Beckhard
1957	De Bijenkorf Department Store – Rotterdam, the Netherlands – with A Elzas
1957	Members' Housing at the Institute for Advanced Study in Princeton, New Jersey – with Robert Gatje
1958	UNESCO Headquarters – Paris, France – with Pier Luigi Nervi and Bernard Zehrfuss
1958	United States Embassy – The Hague, the Netherlands
1958 	Van Leer Office Building – Amstelveen, the Netherlands
1958	Staehelin House – Feldmeilen, Switzerland – with Herbart Beckhard
1958	Krieger House – Bethesda, Maryland
1959	Westchester Reform Temple – Scarsdale, New York – with William Landsberg
1960	Library and Administration Building at Hunter College (now Lehman College) – the Bronx, New York – with Robert Gatje
1959	Annunciation Priory – Convent – Bismarck, North Dakota – with Hamilton Smith
— 1968	Annunciation Priory – Mary College – Bismarck, North Dakota – with Tician Papachristou
1960 	McMullen Beach House – Mantoloking, New Jersey – with Herbert Beckhard
1960	Resort Town Flaine – Master Plan – Haute-Savoie, France – with Herbert Beckhard
— since 1969	Resort Town Flaine – Over fifty buildings with Robert Gatje and Mario Jossa
1961	New York University – Dormitory and Student Center – the Bronx, New York – with Robert Gatje (Campus of Bronx Community College after 1974)
— 1961 & 1970	New York University – Technology Buildings (five structures including Begrisch Hall) – with Hamilton Smith
1961	IBM La Gaude – Research Center – La Gaude, France – with Robert Gatje
— since 1968	IBM France Extensions – La Gaude – with Robert Gatje and Mario Jossa
1961	Kacmarcik House – St Paul, Minnesota

Practice in New York, with eventual partners 

1963	Fairview Heights Apartments – Ithaca, New York – with Hamilton Smith
1966	Koerfer House – Moscia (Tessin), Switzerland – with Herbert Beckhard
1966	The Whitney Museum of American Art third location – New York – with Hamilton Smith
1966	St. Francis de Sales Church – Muskegon, Michigan – with Herbert Beckhard
1966	ZUP de Bayonne – Master Plan & Apartments– Bayonne, France – with Robert Gatje
1967	Laboratoires Sarget-Ambrine – Headquarters – Merignac, France – with Robert Gatje
1968	Department of HUD – Headquarters – Washington, D.C. – with Herbert Beckhard
1968	IBM – Master Plan and Manufacturing Center – Boca Raton, Florida – with Robert Gatje
— since 1970	IBM Boca Extensions – with Robert Gatje
1968	Project for Grand Central Tower – New York – with Herbert Beckhard
1969	Armstrong Rubber/Pirelli Tire Building
1969	Soriano House – Greenwich, Connecticut – with Tician Papachristou
1970	University of Massachusetts – Campus Center – Amherst, Massachusetts – with Herbert Beckhard
1970	Yale University – Becton Laboratory Building – New Haven, Connecticut – with Hamilton Smith
1970	Cleveland Museum of Art – Education Wing – Cleveland, Ohio – with Hamilton Smith
1970	Armstrong Rubber Company – Headquarters – New Haven, Connecticut – with Robert Gatje
1970	Baldegg Convent – "Mother House" – Lucerne, Switzerland – with Robert Gatje
1971	Cleveland Trust Company – Headquarters – Cleveland, Ohio – with Hamilton Smith
1971	Bryn Mawr School for Girls – Lower and Elementary – Baltimore, Maryland – with Hamilton Smith
1973	Sayer House – Glanville, France – with Mario Jossa and Robert Gatje
1974	American Press Institute – Conference Center – Reston, Virginia – with Hamilton Smith
1974	SNET – Telephone Systems Building – Torrington, Connecticut – with Hamilton Smith
1975	Grand Coulee Dam – Third Power Plant – Grand Coulee, WA – with Hamilton Smith
— 1978	Grand Coulee Dam – Visitors Arrival Center – with Hamilton Smith
1975	Mundipharma – Hqs and Mfg Bldg – Limburg, Germany – with Robert Gatje
1975	Clarksburg Harrison Public Library – Clarksburg, West Virginia – with Hamilton Smith
1976	Department of HEW – Headquarters – Washington, D.C. – with Herbert Beckhard
1977	SUNY@ Buffalo – Furnas Hall - School of Engineering and Applied Sciences – Amherst, New York – with Robert Gatje
1980 	Atlanta Central Public Library – Atlanta – with Hamilton Smith

References

External links
 

Breuer

Modernist architecture by architect